Bernardo Caal Xol (born in 1972) is a Guatemalan former teacher and human rights activist.

Life and activism 

Caal was a school teacher, but became one of the leaders of the movement to defend water resources of his community; he denounced alleged irregularities in the operation of mining companies in his native Alta Verapaz. 

In 2017, Caal was imprisoned for an alleged crime of theft of construction equipment and the illegal retention of four workers from a construction company. He was sentenced in 2018 to 7 years in prison. In 2020, Amnesty International declared him a "prisoner of conscience", considering that the charges against him were retaliation for his activism.

In March 2022, Caal was released on good behavior.

See also
 Human rights in Guatemala

References

1972 births
Living people
Guatemalan Maya people
Guatemalan indigenous rights activists
Amnesty International prisoners of conscience held by Guatemala
People from Alta Verapaz Department
Guatemalan environmentalists